Wayward Children is a series of fantasy novellas by American author Seanan McGuire. It takes place at a boarding school for children who have journeyed to magical lands and been forcibly returned to the "real" world. The volumes alternate between being set at the school versus showing the lives of the children while they were in their alternate worlds.

Books 

 Every Heart a Doorway (2016)
 Down Among the Sticks and Bones (2017)
 Beneath the Sugar Sky (2018)
 In an Absent Dream (2019)
 Come Tumbling Down (2020)
 Across the Green Grass Fields (2021)
 Where the Drowned Girls Go (2022)
 Lost in the Moment and Found (2023)

Short stories 

 "Juice Like Wounds" Tor.com (July 13, 2020)
 "In Mercy, Rain" Tor.com (July 18, 2022)
 "Skeleton Song" Tor.com (October 26, 2022)

Awards and recognition

Series 

 Hugo Award for Best Series (2022, Won)

Every Heart a Doorway 

 Nebula Award for Best Novella (2017, Won)
 Hugo Award for Best Novella (2017, Won)
 Locus Award for Best Novella (2017, Won)
 World Fantasy Award for Best Novella (2017, Nominated)
 Alex Awards (2017, Won)

Down Among the Sticks and Bones 

 Alex Awards (2018, Won)
 Hugo Award for Best Novella (2018, Nominated)

Beneath the Sugar Sky 

 World Fantasy Award for Best Novella (2019, Nominated)
 Hugo Award for Best Novella (2019, Nominated)

In An Absent Dream 

 Hugo Award for Best Novella (2020, Nominated)

Come Tumbling Down 

 Hugo Award for Best Novella (2021, Nominated)

Across the Green Grass Fields 

 Hugo Award for Best Novella (2022, Nominated)

Film 
In July 2021, Paramount Pictures acquired the film rights to the Wayward Children series.

References

External references 

 Wayward Children - Author Site
 Wayward Children - Macmillan
 Wayward Children - Goodreads
 Juice Like Wounds - Tor.com
 In Mercy, Rain - Tor.com

Novellas
Novels by Seanan McGuire
Portal fantasy
American fantasy novel series
Book series introduced in 2016
Novels set in boarding schools
Hugo Award-winning works